Romodan is an urban-type settlement in Myrhorod Raion of Poltava Oblast in Ukraine. It is located northwest of the city of Poltava, at the sources of the Voinykha and the Lykhobabivka, both in the drainage basin of the Dnieper. Romodan hosts the administration of Romodan settlement hromada, one of the hromadas of Ukraine. Population:

Economy

Transportation
Romodan railway station is a railway node, with four railway lines running from here to Poltava, Bakhmach, Kyiv, and Kremenchuk. There is intensive passenger traffic.

The settlement is connected by road with Myrhorod and with Lubny, where it has access to highway M03 connecting Kyiv and Kharkiv via Poltava.

References

Urban-type settlements in Myrhorod Raion